El Tarter is a village in Andorra, located in the parish of Canillo.

External links

Populated places in Andorra
Canillo